The 2008 Lenox Industrial Tools 301 was the seventeenth race of the 2008 NASCAR Sprint Cup season, and was run on June 29 of that year at New Hampshire Motor Speedway, located in Loudon, New Hampshire. This was the first race under the new ownership of Speedway Motorsports, Inc. after purchasing the track from Bob Bahre in the autumn of 2007.

Televised coverage was handled by TNT starting at 12:30 PM US EDT, and radio being handled in their swan song at this facility by MRN starting at 1:15 PM US EDT and simulcast via Sirius Satellite Radio. Starting with the fall race, SMI-owned Performance Racing Network will carry the events at this track, as this was a result of a compromise on who had radio rights for the 2008 events (save for the NASCAR Craftsman Truck Series race in September, as MRN holds all rights to that series.) This race also was planned to be the first year of an additional lap on the  track, as suggested by race sponsor Lenox Industrial Tools that says that their employees "go the extra mile" for their customers. However, due to a severe thunderstorm that bore down on the region, the race was stopped with seventeen laps to go.

Qualifying
In what may have been 2008's biggest surprise, Québécois Patrick Carpentier won the pole position over Bobby Labonte following a rain delay of almost two hours.

Race recap
There were seven cautions in all, including one that involved an incident between points leader Kyle Busch and Juan Pablo Montoya after the yellow flag waved.  Montoya broadsided Kyle Busch just after crossing the start-finish line in what turned out to be the last of several confrontations in the race between the two, and following the race, Montoya was penalized two laps for aggressive driving.  A rainstorm shortened the race seventeen laps shy of the scheduled distance, and thanks to pit strategy and fuel mileage, Kurt Busch won the race, while Michael Waltrip had his best finish since winning the fall race at Talladega Superspeedway in 2003, and J. J. Yeley finished  third.

NOTE: Race was cut short to 284 laps due to rain.

Failed to qualify: Marcos Ambrose (#21) and Tony Raines (#34).

References

Lenox Industrial Tools 301
Lenox Industrial Tools 301
NASCAR races at New Hampshire Motor Speedway